Vasin is a Russian male surname that is derived from Vasiliy, the male given name Vasily, and literally means "Vasya's". Its feminine counterpart is Vasina. It may refer to:

 Denys Vasin (born 1989), Ukrainian footballer
 Miroslav Vasin (born 1955), Serbian politician
 Ted Vasin (born 1966), American artist
 Viktor Vasin (born 1988), Russian footballer
 Vladimir Vasin (born 1947), Soviet diver

Russian-language surnames
Ukrainian-language surnames